Shep Goodman is an American New York–based multi-platinum record producer, songwriter, and musician. He got his start in the music industry, by fronting the Elektra Records signed rock-act, Coward. After the disbandment of the band, he started the music production company Sheppard Music Inc with Kenny Gioia. They were known as "Shep & Kenny", and began writing and producing for various artists. One of the first break thru songs Shep and Kenny produced was the pop radio production of the Lee Ann Womack hit "I Hope You Dance".  They then went on to write/produce for many pop and rock artists including Mandy Moore, LFO, Hall & Oates, Ingrid Michaelson, and many others.

Goodman held the position of Vice President of A&R at Universal Motown Records from 2007 until 2011. He is currently co-owner of Dirty Canvas Productions, which is a full scale music production company focused on artist development. The first artist signed to Dirty Canvas was Brooklyn based alternative rock band American Authors, whose song "Best Day of My Life" (co-written and produced by Goodman) went on to be one of the biggest global hits of 2014, achieving multi-platinum status in multiple countries.

Artists Goodman has worked with
American Authors
Young Rising Sons
Rob Thomas
Lee Ann Womack
Ingrid Michaelson
Hall & Oates
Bayside
888 - Mngt
Jonas Brothers
Mandy Moore
Aaron Carter
LFO
Dreamers
MisterWives
Forever the Sickest Kids
Peyton List
Micky James
The Orphan The Poet
The unlikely Candidates
Cosmos & Creature
Brick + Mortar
The Karma Killers
Livingston
Four Year Strong
Head Automatica
Carter Rubin
He Is We
Lydia
Cute Is What We Aim For
Straylight Run
Get Scared
Tina Parol
Blue October
Red Car Wire
Kim Sozzi aka Sozzi
Templeton Pek
Her Bright Skies
Lions Lions
Vitamin C
Her Bright Skies
From Autumn To Ashes
The Never Ever
Drake Bell
Jordan Knight
Punchline
Brooke Hogan
Willa Ford
Paulina Rubio
The Distance
Westland (band)
Echo Screen

References

External links
Official Website

American record producers
Living people
Place of birth missing (living people)
Year of birth missing (living people)